The QWERTZ or QWERTZU keyboard is a typewriter and keyboard layout widely used in Central Europe. The name comes from the first six letters at the top left of the keyboard:.

Overview 

This change was made for three major reasons:
  and  often appear next to each other in the German orthography, and typewriter jamming would be reduced by placing the two keys so they could be typed with separate hands.
, meaning "to" in German, and also a very common prefix can also be written very easily.

Similar to many other non-English keyboards:
 Part of the keyboard is adapted to include language-specific characters, e.g. umlauted vowels (ä, ö, ü) in German and Austrian keyboards.
 QWERTZ keyboards usually change the right  key into an  key to access a third level of key assignments. This is necessary because the language-specific characters leave no room to have all the special symbols of ASCII, needed by programmers among others, available on the first or second (shifted) levels without unduly increasing the size of the keyboard.
 The placements of some special symbols are changed when compared to the English (UK and US) versions of QWERTY.

Some of the special key inscriptions are often changed from an abbreviation to a graphical symbol (for example  becomes a hollow arrow pointing up,  becomes a left-pointing arrow). (See: Key labels)

Variants
The QWERTZ layout is fairly widely used in Germany and in the majority of Central European and Balkan countries that use the Latin script. Many German-speaking regions use this layout, but the German-speaking East Cantons of Belgium use AZERTY instead. Many of the other countries were historically a part of Austria-Hungary or under the influence of Nazi German occupation (and its underlying culture and technology), so they used German typewriters with the QWERTZ layout.

Albanian

QWERTZ is the default keyboard layout for the Albanian language in Microsoft Windows.

Austria and Germany

The PC keyboard layout commonly used in Germany and Austria is based on one defined in a former edition (October 1988) of the German standard DIN 2137-2. The current edition DIN 2137:2012-06 standardizes it as the first (basic) one of three layouts, calling it “T1” (or “keyboard layout 1”).

It employs dead keys to type accented characters like “é”, and the  key to access characters in the third level (e.g. “[”, “]”, “@”, the euro sign “€”, or the micro- “µ”). The “T2” layout as specified in the 2012 edition of the German standard also uses the group selection to access special characters like the long s, or foreign characters like “Æ” or  “Ə”.

Sorbian
Sorbian QWERTZ is practically identical to the German layout, but the additional Sorbian characters can be entered with dead keys; it has three different layouts: Standard, Legacy, and Extended. All are supported by Microsoft Windows (Windows 7 and later only).

Czech 

The QWERTZ keyboard layout is commonly used in the Czech Republic, but the QWERTY variant is an unofficial option. The characters from the American keyboard (@#$&\|[]{}<>^`~*) and some other characters and diacritic signs (÷×¤€ßĐđŁł°˘˝·˛¸) that are missing on the Czech mechanical typewriter keyboard can be accessed with the AltGr key. The layout on the picture is supported by Microsoft Windows. The QWERTZ layout is more efficient for Czech, as the Z letter is slightly more common than the Y letter, but only 4% more efficient than QWERTY.

An internet poll in 2013 stated that 56% of Czech users used QWERTZ and 44% used QWERTY, but in 2020 57% of Czech users used QWERTY and 43% used QWERTZ.

Hungary

On some keyboards, the "" key is located to the left of the Enter key, while on others it is placed to the left of the backspace key (see the two pictures on the right).

An unusual feature of this Hungarian keyboard layout is the position of the 0 (zero): it is located to the left of the 1, so that most of the accented characters can be together on the right side of the keyboard.

The official layout is of type QWERTZ, which is therefore the most widely used keyboard layout in the country. QWERTY used to be widespread due to there not being a dedicated Hungarian layout commonly available for older computers, but since this is no longer an issue, virtually everyone uses QWERTZ in everyday computing.

On "ISO" keyboards (as in the first picture) and "BAE" keyboards (as in the second), the  key is positioned on the key to the right of the left  key. To adapt to 101/104-key (ANSI) keyboards which do not have that key, the MS Windows QWERTY layout has put the Í on the usual key for the 0 (zero) while the 0 has been moved to that key's tertiary layer; on Macintosh computers, both layouts (QWERTY and QWERTZ) have this adaptation.

Poland
 

A variant of the QWERTZ keyboard has been used in Poland, but QWERTY keyboards have been dominant since the early 1990s.

Romanian 

The standard keyboard layout as established by the standard SR 13392:2004 is QWERTY. However, a Romanian QWERTZ keyboard (corresponding to older standards) was set up on Windows 3.1 and renamed "Romanian (Legacy)" on all versions since Windows Vista, because of the introduction of the two standard QWERTY layouts with the correct diacritics. Since it was devised before the disunification of "Ș" (S-comma) and "Ț" (T-comma) with "Ş" (S-cedilla; used in Turkic languages) and "Ţ" (T cedilla), the characters with cedilla were used in the layout (and these are still used in the default 1250 encoding). In 2012, a version with commas was made and it is available as a custom layout to be installed by the interested end-user.

Slovak  

Typewriters in Slovakia have used the QWERTZ layout quite similar to the layout used on the Czech typewriters. Slovak QWERTZ layout differs from the Czech one in using the letter  instead of the Czech  on the same position, also the letter  is on the position of Czech  and the letter  is on the position of Czech . There are 2 more keys that differ in these 2 languages: Slovak  key replaces the Czech  key and Slovak  key replaces the Czech  key. There are 17 characters from American keyboard (@#$&\|[]{}<>^`~*') that are missing on the Slovak keyboard because of the presence of the Slovak letters (ľščňťžôúáíýéä°´ˇ§). Users can access them with the  key, however, position of these characters varies between different operating systems. Besides the QWERTZ keyboard layout inherited from the typewriter era, QWERTY layout is also used by computer users in Slovakia.

South Slavic Latin

The Serbo-Croatian Latin and Slovene keyboard layout has five additional special characters Č, Ć, Ž, Š and Đ. This keyboard layout was standardized in the 1980s in Yugoslavia. Characters Ć and Đ are only part of Gaj's Latin alphabet but not part of the Slovene alphabet, nevertheless they remain in Slovenian keyboards (for economic reasons, for historical reasons and for writing words in the closely related South Slavic languages). The Ž is on the right side of the Ć key on keyboards which have a longer backspace key, and the usual inverted L shaped Enter key. The layout makes heavy use of the AltGr (right Alt) key for non-alphabetic characters and dead key combinations for adding diacritics to Latin characters. It is possible to type German and Italian using only the Serbo-Croatian keyboard layout.

There is a proposed variant of new Slovene keyboard layout, which would remove Ć and Đ from top layout and add @ instead. The command keys would also become translated into Slovene and some minor second level layout changes would be made.

However, the Apple keyboards for Croatian are QWERTY.

Swiss (German, French, Italian, Romansh), Liechtenstein, Luxembourg

The layout of the Swiss keyboard is established by the national standard SN 074021:1999. It is designed to allow easy access to frequently used accents of the French, German and Italian languages and major currency signs. It was designed from the beginning for usage with multiple languages, also beyond Swiss languages, in mind. The difference between the Swiss German and the Swiss French layout is that the German variety has the German umlauts (ä, ö, ü) accessible in the unshifted state, while the French version has some French accented characters (é, à, è) accessible in the unshifted state. The actual keyboards have the keys engraved for both variations; the difference is only in the driver (software) settings. In the latest versions of Windows there are also separately listed driver settings for Swiss Italian and Swiss Romansh, but they correspond to the Swiss French and Swiss German layout, respectively. In Mac OS X 10.6 and Linux, only Swiss French and Swiss German are available, and on iPadOS, the only layout is Swiss German. (The Swiss German layout is not available for anything else.)

On Windows, Swiss German does not include the esszett (ß) ligature, which is only used in Germany and Austria, meaning that that letter is unimportant in Switzerland, and is therefore not found on the keyboard.

On Windows, Swiss French does not include the ù accent, which is only used in France and Belgium (even though it is used in Italian), meaning that that letter is unimportant in Switzerland, and is therefore not found on the keyboard.

While the German keyboard uses German labels for its keys (e.g.  instead of ), Swiss keyboards use the English abbreviations as a "neutral" solution, as they are used for all the national languages of Switzerland.

Luxembourg does not have a keyboard layout of its own. Public education and administration use the Swiss-French keyboard which also represents the Microsoft Windows standard keyboard layout for Luxembourg, while some of the private sector prefer the Belgian layout. Other places may use the US layout. Liechtenstein, which mostly speaks Swiss German and the Liechtenstein German dialect, also use the Swiss German layout without an ß character.

See also

AZERTY
QWERTY
QZERTY
German keyboard layout
Blickensderfer typewriter
Dvorak keyboard layout
Neo, an optimized German keyboard layout

References

Computer keyboard types
Latin-script keyboard layouts